Yves Saint Laurent may refer to:

 Yves Saint Laurent (designer) (1936–2008), French fashion designer
 Yves Saint Laurent (brand), a luxury fashion house founded in 1961 by Yves Saint Laurent and his partner, Pierre Bergé
 Yves Saint Laurent (film), a 2014 film
 Yves Saint Laurent Museum in Marrakesh, Morocco

See also

 
Saint Laurent (film), a 2014 film about Yves Saint Laurent
Saint Laurent (disambiguation)
Yves (disambiguation)
 YSL (disambiguation)